Isaiah Miles (born June 9, 1994) is an American professional basketball player for AEK Athens of the Greek Basket League and the Basketball Champions League. He played college basketball at Saint Joseph's University.

Early life and high school
Miles was born in Baltimore, Maryland and grew up in the suburb of Owings Mills. He attended Glenelg Country School for three years before transferring to Milford Mill Academy before his senior year. He was a standout basketball player at both schools and was an All-Metro selection by The Baltimore Sun in his junior and senior seasons.

College career
Miles played four seasons for the St. Joseph's Hawks, starting out as a reserve player and gradually gaining more playing time until he was a starter his final two seasons. In his first season as a starter, he  averaged 10.7 points and 5.1 rebounds.

In his senior season, Miles averaged 18.1 points and 8.1 rebounds per game as the Hawks won the Atlantic 10 Conference title. In the first round of the 2016 NCAA tournament, Miles hit a three-pointer with nine seconds left to  put the Hawks ahead against Cincinnati. Miles was named second team all conference and Most Improved Player by both the Atlantic 10 and the Big 5 at the end of the season. He credited his improvement to losing over 20 pounds during the offseason by eliminating fast food, specifically the Wendy's Baconator, from his diet. Over the course of his college career, Miles averaged 10.3 points and 4.7 rebounds per game in 107 games played (68 starts). He graduated from Saint Joseph's University with a degree in business.

Professional career

JDA Dijon

Miles earned an invitation to the NBA Draft Combine but was not selected in the 2016 NBA draft. After a stint with the Dallas Mavericks NBA Summer League team, Miles signed with JDA Dijon of the French LNB Pro A on July 24, 2016. In 34 games with the team, he averaged 12.2 points and 4.9 rebounds per game. After his performance with Dijon, Miles was offered a spot on the Philadelphia 76ers Summer League roster.

Uşak Sportif
Miles signed with Uşak Sportif of the Turkish Super League on June 17, 2017. In 16 league games he averaged 10.7 points, 3.6 rebounds and 1.1 assists per game and was again a member of the 76ers Summer League team. Miles was the 76ers second-leading scorer at 10.4 points per game and shot 47.6 percent on 3-point attempts in five games (two starts) of Summer League competition.

Limoges
Miles returned to France after signing with Limoges CSP on July 21, 2018. He was named the Most Valuable Player for the 4th round of the 2018–19 EuroCup after scoring 23 points and grabbing seven rebounds against Tofaş S.K. Miles averaged 9.2 points, 3.8 rebounds, and 1.1 assists in 34 LNB Pro A games as Limoges finished 7th in the league and lost to Monaco in the first round of the playoffs. Miles also averaged 10.3 points and 3.3 rebounds per game in 14 EuroCup games.

Following the end of the season, Miles was named to the Orlando Magic's Summer League roster and averaged 6.3 points and 2.3 rebounds in four games. Miles participated in The Basketball Tournament for Team Hines after the conclusion of Summer League.

Delaware Blue Coats
On August 8, 2019, Miles signed an Exhibit 10 contract with the Philadelphia 76ers. He was waived by the 76ers on October 19, 2019 and was added to the roster of the team's NBA G League affiliate, the Delaware Blue Coats. Miles was waived by the Blue Coats on January 21, 2020. He appeared in 11 games, averaging 6.1 points and 2.2 rebounds per game.

Cholet Basket
On February 26, 2020, he has signed with Cholet of the LNB Pro A.

Hapoel Holon
On August 15, 2020, Miles signed with Hapoel Holon of the Israeli Basketball Premier League.

Promitheas Patras
On August 20, 2021, Miles signed with Greek club Promitheas Patras which competes in the EuroCup.

AEK Athens
On November 18, 2022, Miles signed with Greek club AEK Athens which competes in the Basketball Champions League.

Personal life
Miles is an avid fan of Superhero comics, a hobby that he picked up from his father, and has numerous comic book characters tattooed on the full length of his right arm.

References

External links
Saint Joseph's Hawks bio
College Statistics at Sports-Reference.com
RealGM profile
EuroBasket profile

1994 births
Living people
AEK B.C. players
American expatriate basketball people in France
American expatriate basketball people in Greece
American expatriate basketball people in Israel
American expatriate basketball people in Turkey
American men's basketball players
Basketball players from Maryland
Delaware Blue Coats players
Forwards (basketball)
Hapoel Holon players
JDA Dijon Basket players
Limoges CSP players
People from Owings Mills, Maryland
Promitheas Patras B.C. players
Saint Joseph's Hawks men's basketball players
Sportspeople from Baltimore County, Maryland
Uşak Sportif players